The Ngasa or  Ngas also known as Ongamo (Wangasa, in Swahili)  are an ethnic and linguistic group based on the northeastern slopes of Mount Kilimanjaro in Rombo District, Kilimanjaro Region, Tanzania. In 2000 the Nilotic ethnic Ngasa population was estimated to number 4,285, with only 200 to 300 members continuing to speak the Ngasa language .  Speakers have shifted to Chagga, a dominant regional Bantu language.

Ethnic groups in Tanzania
Indigenous peoples of East Africa